is a mountain in the Nasu Volcanic Zone. It is located in Chitose, Hokkaidō, Japan. The mountain is the source of the Shiribetsu River.

References

Mountains of Hokkaido